Mariana Vasconcelos Bandhold, more popularly known by her stage name as Mariana Bandhold, is a Portuguese-American singer, actress, and songwriter from the Portuguese Riviera. She was a contestant in the second season of The Voice Portugal.

Career
Bandhold began singing at the age of 7. Bandhold was already acting by the age of 12, when she starred as Louisa von Trapp in famed Portuguese director Filipe La Féria's 2007 production of The Sound of Music, at the Teatro Politeama in Lisbon.

in 2007, Bandhold and her mother, singer Ana Vasconcelos, starred together as a team in Família Superstar, a family-based, team song competition.

In 2014, Bandhold participated in the second season of The Voice Portugal, being coached by Mickael Carreira. She advanced as a semifinalist, but was eliminated in the live shows. Bandhold's mother would go on to participate in season three of The Voice Portugal.

Personal life
Bandhold was born in Cascais, on the Portuguese Riviera, to a Portuguese mother, actress and singer Ana Vasconcelos, and an American father, and grew up in the Portuguese Riviera. She attended the Carlucci American International School of Lisbon until graduating high school, and subsequently graduated from the AMDA College and Conservatory of the Performing Arts, in Hollywood, California.

Discography

Filmography

Theatre

References

External links
Official Website
IMDB page

Living people
1995 births
The Voice of Portugal contestants
21st-century Portuguese women singers
Portuguese women songwriters
Portuguese dancers
People from Cascais
Portuguese people of American descent